Tamor Pingla Wildlife Sanctuary is located in Surajpur District, Chhattisgarh, India. It is named after the Tamor Hill and Pingla Nalla, the old and prominent features of the area.

Geography and history 
The northern boundary is the Moran river, eastern boundary is Bonga Nalla, and western boundary is Rihand River. This was notified as Wildlife Sanctuary in 1978. In 2011, it was notified by Chhattisgarh's Government as a part of Surguja Jashpur Elephant Reserve. There are seven revenue villages within this sanctuary, namely Khond, Injani, Archoka, Durgain, Kesar, Chattauli and Dhaulpur. Except for Khond, these villages are very small, with less than 20 households. The Tamor Hills, having an area of 250 km2, is a table land rising sharply from the neighboring villages of Tamki, Ghui and Barpetia.

Flora 
The area, which is under Tamor, Khond and Pingla Ranges of the Surguja Jashpur Elephant Reserve Forest Division, consists of sal and bamboo forests.

Fauna 

Access 
November to June is ideal to visit the sanctuary. Surajpur Railway Station is the nearest railhead. A forest guest house is available at Ramkola.

See also 
 Sanjay-Dubri Tiger Reserve
 Surguja State

Notes 

Wildlife sanctuaries in Chhattisgarh
Chota Nagpur dry deciduous forests
1978 establishments in Madhya Pradesh
Protected areas established in 1978